Korean International School in Hanoi (KISH;) is a Korean international school in Cầu Giấy District, Hanoi, Vietnam.

 it had about 1,000 students. It serves elementary school, junior school, and senior school.

History
It opened in 2006. Originally it had 52 students, all in the elementary level.

References

External links
 Korean International School in Hanoi 

International schools in Hanoi
Korean international schools in Vietnam
2006 establishments in Vietnam
Educational institutions established in 2006
High schools in Hanoi